The McMillan Reservoir is a reservoir in Washington, D.C. that supplies the majority of the city's municipal water. It was originally called the Howard University Reservoir or the Washington City Reservoir, and was completed in 1902 by the U.S. Army Corps of Engineers.

Construction history
The Macmillan Reservoir was built in 1902 on the site of Smith Spring, one of the springs previously used for drinking water. Washington's earliest residents relied on natural springs but this came to be inadequate as the city's population grew. In 1850, Congress determined that the Potomac River should be the city's principal source of water.

Washington Aqueduct
A congressionally funded engineering study was conducted to determine the most available mode of supplying water to the city. Work and study conducted under the leadership of Lieutenant Montgomery C. Meigs culminated into the development of the Washington Aqueduct which began operations on January 3, 1859. Initially the system provided water to the city from the Little Falls Branch in Maryland, until the aqueduct construction was completed. Regular water service from the Potomac River source through the aqueduct commenced in 1864.

Washington City Tunnel
In the early years of operation the water was routed through the system's two earlier-built reservoirs, Dalecarlia and Georgetown, which were designed to settle sediment out of the water. In 1873 the Army began construction of a new water supply tunnel, led by Garrett Lydecker, a major in the Army Corps of Engineers. The tunnel was known as the Washington City Tunnel, to provide more storage, sedimentation and distribution capacity for the system. Lydecker predicted the tunnel would cost about $53,000 to build.

Construction of the tunnel was halted in the 1880s due to a variety of problems including funding shortages, cost overruns, bribery and fraud associated with the construction process. During that period some improvements were made to the Dalecarlia portion of the system, and work on the tunnel finally resumed in 1898.

The tunnel was completed in 1901, after an additional $800,000 expenditure, and the McMillan Reservoir began operation in 1902.

Filtration plant

By 1902 it became apparent that the sedimentation process in the several reservoirs was not effective against pathogens such as bacteria, and was therefore not sufficiently protective of public health. To handle population growth and municipal sanitation needs, the city built the McMillan Sand Filtration Site in 1905. This facility implemented an innovative water purification system using slow sand filter technology to treat 75 million gallons (280 million liters) per day. It helped quell typhoid epidemics and other communicable diseases throughout the city.

In 1907 the reservoir and filtration plant were named in honor of Senator James McMillan of Michigan, who chaired the Senate Committee on the District of Columbia and supported development of the water supply facilities. Congress officially designated the site as a park in March 1911.

Subsequent improvements to the city water system were initiated beginning in the 1920s. The regular use of chlorine as a disinfectant began in 1923 at the McMillan filtration plant. Another treatment plant was completed in 1928 adjacent to the Dalecarlia Reservoir using a newer technology, a rapid sand filter.

In 1941, due to security concerns during World War II, the entire site was permanently closed and fenced off due to fear of sabotage.

After the war, the property remained closed to the public, but continued to supply the city with filtered water. The growth of the city population led to further expansions at the Dalecarlia site in the 1950s. The slow sand filtration system at MacMillan was replaced with a rapid sand filtration system, built adjacent to the old system, in 1985. In 1986, the Army Corps of Engineers decommissioned the slow sand filtration site and declared it surplus. The old treatment site was purchased by the District of Columbia from the federal government in 1987 for $9.3 million, and the site began to deteriorate due to lack of maintenance. At that time DC government had no specific plan for the site.

In 1991 the 25 acre (100,000 m²) McMillan Reservoir site, located between Michigan Avenue, North Capitol Street, and First Street in Northwest Washington, D.C., was designated a DC Historic Landmark. In 2000, and again in 2005, it was placed on the "List of Most Endangered Properties."

McMillan Fountain

The McMillan Fountain is a public artwork by American artist Herbert Adams located on the Reservoir grounds. The fountain, completed in 1912 and dedicated in October 1919, consists of a bronze The Three Graces placed upon a pink granite base. Cast by Roman Bronze Works, the fountain was originally part of a large landscape setting designed by Charles A. Platt. A tribute to James McMillan, the fountain was paid for by citizens of Michigan, who raised $25,000 by way of pennies, nickels and dimes donated by public school children. Congress also funded totaling $15,000 towards the completion.

Sand filtration site post-closure development

See also
McMillan Plan

References

External links

Washington Aqueduct - U.S. Army Corps of Engineers
Pictures of the McMillan slow sand plant, with history

Reservoirs in Washington, D.C.
Potomac River watershed